James Francis Rooney (born September 29, 1935) is a retired American politician and local administrator.  A Democrat, he served 12 years in the Wisconsin State Assembly, representing Racine, Wisconsin, (1973–1985) and served in Racine County government for nearly 30 years.  After leaving the Assembly, Rooney served another 24 years as chairman of the Wisconsin Waterways Commission (1985–2019) and was one of the key architects of Racine's lakefront revitalization.  He still serves on the city of Racine's Harbor Commission.

Early life and career
Rooney was born in Racine, Wisconsin, and graduated from Racine's St. Catherine's High School in 1953.   He was drafted into the United States Army in 1954, and served two years stationed at Fort Eustis, Virginia.  He was employed as a surveyor and later business manager for many years for Nielsen & Madsen, an engineering consulting partnership in Racine.

Public service
In 1966, Rooney made his first attempt at elected office, when he was elected to the Racine County Board of Supervisors with the endorsement of outgoing supervisor, Herman Luedtke.  He was reelected nine times, serving concurrent with his Assembly career.  At the start of the 1982 session, he was elected chairman of the County Board.  He served as chairman until resigning from the board in December 1984.  In 1970, he was also named Racine Harbor Commissioner, a position he continues to hold in 2020.
 
In 1972, Rooney ran for the Wisconsin State Assembly in the newly drawn 61st State Assembly district.  The 61st district, covering northern Racine and the villages of Wind Point and North Bay, was drawn roughly in line with the former 2nd Racine County Assembly district, which had been occupied by Democrat Manny S. Brown since 1965.  Brown did not run for election in the new seat, but Rooney did face an opponent in the Democratic primary—former radio news director John Flanagan.  Rooney prevailed in the primary, and carried 56% of the general election vote in November over Republican Thomas C. Mortenson. He was subsequently reelected five times, serving 12 years.

In the Assembly, Rooney served for his entire legislative career on the Highways Committee, and served on the committees on Financial Institutions and Insurance, on Consumer and Commercial Credit, and on Insurance, Cooperatives and Risk Management.  For the 1983–1984 session, he was elected Democratic caucus chairman.  His most consequential legislative act was likely the creation of the Wisconsin Waterways Commission (1977 Wisc. Act 274).  The law diverted a small percentage of the state gas tax for highway funding to be utilized for harbor and river improvements, including the harbor and lakefront projects that Rooney championed in Racine County.

In June 1984, Rooney announced he would seek appointment to the county highway commissioner job rather than running for reelection to the Assembly.  In December 1984, he received the appointment from county executive Leonard Ziolkowski, received unanimous approval from the County Board, and resigned his seat on the County Board.  Rooney served as highway commissioner until 1988, when he was appointed county public works commissioner, where he remained until retiring in 1994.

Concurrent with this service, in 1985, Governor Tony Earl appointed Rooney to chair the Wisconsin Waterways Commission, which he had largely been responsible for creating in 1977.  Rooney had been critical of previous governors' appointments to the commission, which lacked representation from southeast lakefront communities which failed to prioritize improvements on Lake Michigan; with the support of Governor Earl and State Representative Jeffrey A. Neubauer, Rooney quickly began allocating grant money to Racine lakeshore improvements.  Rooney was reappointed by governors Tommy Thompson, Jim Doyle, and Scott Walker and continued to serve as chairman of the commission until March 2019.

In 1998, Rooney returned to politics, narrowly winning another term on the County Board of Supervisors over local newspaper publisher Ken Lumpkin.  In this term he served alongside his son, James C. Rooney.  Rooney was defeated seeking reelection in 2000, in a rematch of his 1998 election.

A 2015 event on Racine's waterfront celebrated the completion of numerous harbor and lakefront projects and honored Rooney for his decades of service on the lakefront improvements.  The event was co-hosted by Racine County Executive Jonathan Delagrave and Racine Mayor John Dickert.  Delagrave remarked, "Racine's Lakefront, Marina and breakwater area are irreplaceable resources forour city and our county as a whole.  I applaud and am thankful for the passion and dedication of all those involved, especially the persistence and vision of Jim Rooney."

Rooney continues to serve as chairman of the Racine Harbor Commission, a position he has held since 1970.

Personal life and family
James Rooney is a fourth generation Racinian—his great grandparents settled on Racine's north side in the 1850s, his grandfather was president of the local painter's union, and his father was President of the Racine City Council.

James Rooney and his wife, Nancy, have four adult children and still reside in Racine.  Rooney is an avid sailor and owns two boats, he has been a member of the Racine Yacht Club for nearly 50 years, and is a member of the Kiwanis Club of Greater Racine.

Electoral history

Wisconsin Assembly, 61st district (1972–1980)

Wisconsin Assembly, 20th district (1982)

Racine County Board (1998–2000)

References

External links
 Downtown Racine
 Reefpoint Marina
 Len Ziolkowski Harbor Park and Reefpoint Marina
 Racine Harbor at Marinas.com

 
|-

1935 births
Living people
Politicians from Racine, Wisconsin
Businesspeople from Wisconsin
County supervisors in Wisconsin
Democratic Party members of the Wisconsin State Assembly
Military personnel from Wisconsin
United States Army soldiers